Ganbatyn Boldbaatar (Mongolian: Ганбатын Болдбаатар) is a male Mongolian judoka. He won the gold medal in the 60 kg category at the 2014 World Judo Championships.

References

External links
 

Living people
Mongolian male judoka
Judoka at the 2014 Asian Games
1987 births
Asian Games medalists in judo
World judo champions
Asian Games silver medalists for Mongolia
Medalists at the 2014 Asian Games
20th-century Mongolian people
21st-century Mongolian people